Van Brakel may refer to:

People
Jan van Brakel (1638–1690), Dutch rear-admiral
Nouchka van Brakel, Dutch film director

Other
HNLMS Jan van Brakel (F825), Dutch naval frigate